Amir Hadad (Hebrew: אמיר חדד, born 17 February 1978) is a retired Israeli professional tennis player.
His highest singles ATP ranking was World No. 180, achieved in April 2003, and his highest doubles ranking was No. 87, achieved in May 2003.

Tennis career

Hadad turned pro in 1995. Most of his success has been on the challenger and future circuits.  In May 2002, in the first round of the French Open, he upset world No. 78 Christophe Rochus of Belgium, 6–1, 6–2, 6–7 (4,) 6–2.  Hadad has trained at the Israel Tennis Centers.

In mid-July 2002, Amir and his partner Martín Vassallo Argüello won the Seascape Challenger Tournament doubles final.
His best result was reaching the 3rd round doubles at the 2002 Wimbledon Open, with partner Aisam-ul-Haq Qureshi of Pakistan.  The Israeli and Pakistani team received major criticism because of political tensions, but Hadad and Aisam dedicated their run to peace.  They won an upset victory in the 2nd round over the No. 11 seeded team of Ellis Ferreira and Rick Leach. On 6 February 2003, Hadad and Qureshi were awarded the Arthur Ashe Humanitarian Award.

Hadad won tournaments in Groningen, Kyoto, Rome, San Remo, and Vietnam in 2003.

In April 2005 Hadad and partner Harel Levy won a F1 doubles title in Hungary.  Hadad enjoyed his best singles performance in years at the Hungary F3 tournament held in Hódmezővásárhely during May 2005.  He lost to the eventual champion Boris Pašanski in the finals, 7–6, 6–1.
Later in 2005, Hadad and Levy  won the Hungary F1 tournament in Budapest, defeating Nikola Martinovic and Josko Topic 5–7, 6–2, 6–1 in the final.  They beat Bastian Knittel and Marius Zay 6–1, 6–0 to capture the F2 title in Miskolc.  Levy and Hadad then competed in May in Fürth, where they took the title from Jan Frode Andersen and Johan Landsberg, 6–1, 6–2.  In July they won at Budaors, Hungary, defeating Adam Chadaj and Stephane Robert 6–4, 6–7(7), 6–3.

In February 2006, he won a F1 tournament in Israel.  In May 2006, playing with Konstantinos Economidis, he won in Rome.  In November 2007, he won tournaments in Israel with Lazar Magdinčev (MKD) and Harel Levy.

In May 2008 he won in Hungary with Stefan Wauters.  In September and October he won with Attila Balázs in Bosnia & Herzegovina and Croatia.

Davis Cup

Hadad played Davis Cup for Israel from 1998 to 2009, winning 5 of his 12 matches.

World TeamTennis

Hadad played World TeamTennis for the Boston Lobsters in 2006, 2007 and 2008.  He played for the St. Louis Aces in 2003 and 2004.

Personal life 
Hadad is of Tunisian-Jewish descent.

See also
 List of select Jewish tennis players

References

External links 
 
 
 
 Jewish Virtual Library bio
 Qureshi & Hadad interview on ESPN

1978 births
Living people
Israeli male tennis players
Jewish tennis players
People from Lod
Israeli people of Tunisian-Jewish descent